Zarya is a rural locality (a settlement) in Mayskoye Rural Settlement, Vologodsky District, Vologda Oblast, Russia. The population was 830 as of 2002. There are 4 streets.

Geography 
Zarya is located 27 km northwest of Vologda (the district's administrative centre) by road. Derevenka is the nearest rural locality.

References 

Rural localities in Vologodsky District